Joelle Behlok or Joëlle Behlock (born 27 October 1979) is a Lebanese fashion designer, television presenter, actress, and winner of the Miss Lebanon beauty contest in 1997. She finished in the Top 10 in Miss World 1997.

Life 
Behlok was educated at the Collège des Frères Maristes Champville in Jounieh, then at the Lebanese University of Baabda.

After winning the Miss Lebanon Contest, she worked in advertising for gold jewelry and ornaments, then began an acting career and took the lead role in "The Last Cavalier" series in 2002. She later led the "Style with Joelle" fashion show on MBC TV channel.

In 2004, there was a defamation case about her in Dubai.

Family 
She is married to Adel Nader and has three children.

References

External links 

1979 births
Lebanese beauty pageant winners
Lebanese University alumni
Living people
Miss World 1997 delegates
Actresses from Beirut